The hog-nosed catfish (Corydoras multiradiatus) is a tropical freshwater fish belonging to the Corydoradinae sub-family of the family Callichthyidae. It is native to South America, and is found in the western Amazon basin in Ecuador and Peru. This species is traditionally placed in Brochis but the genus is a synonym of Corydoras. FishBase continues to recognize Brochis as a valid genus.

The fish has about 17 dorsal fin rays as compared with the 11 or 12 commonly seen in Corydoras splendens. The snout is considerably longer than other species in the genus which explains the common name.

It feeds on worms, benthic crustaceans, insects, and plant matter. It lays eggs in dense vegetation and adults do not guard the eggs.

The hog-nosed catfish is of commercial importance in the aquarium trade industry, although it is relatively rare or confused with C. splendens. Care is virtually identical to C. splendens.

See also
List of freshwater aquarium fish species

References 

Callichthyidae
Catfish of South America
Catfish
Catfish
Catfish
Fish described in 1960